Events from the year 1750 in Scotland.

Incumbents

Law officers 
 Lord Advocate – William Grant of Prestongrange
 Solicitor General for Scotland – Patrick Haldane of Gleneagles, jointly with Alexander Hume

Judiciary 
 Lord President of the Court of Session – Lord Arniston the Elder
 Lord Justice General – Lord Ilay
 Lord Justice Clerk – Lord Tinwald

Events 
 Robert Gordon's College, Aberdeen, opens.
 James Short's Gregorian telescope (38 cm (14″) aperture reflector), the world's largest at this date, is constructed.
 Approximate date – Alexander Stephen begins shipbuilding at Burghead on the Moray Firth, origin of Alexander Stephen and Sons.

Births 
 7 January – Robert Anderson, literary editor (died 1803)
 18 February – David Bogue, nonconformist leader (died 1825 in England)
 27 May – George Hill, Church of Scotland minister and academic (died 1819)
 15 July (bapt.) – Robert Jackson, military physician and surgeon (died 1827 in England)
 5 September – Robert Fergusson, poet writing in Braid Scots (died 1774)
 14 October – John Fraser, botanist (died 1811 in England)
 3 December – Hew Whitefoord Dalrymple, British Army general and Governor of Gibraltar (died 1830 in England)
 8 December – Lady Anne Barnard, née Lindsay, poet, ballad and travel writer (died 1825 in England)
 William Dunbar, merchant, plantation owner, naturalist, astronomer and explorer (died 1810 in the United States)
 Approximate date – George Robertson, topographical, agricultural and genealogical writer (died 1832)

Deaths 
 5 March – Sir Alexander Reid, 2nd Baronet, laird and politician
 3 May – John Willison, evangelical Church of Scotland minister and religious writer (born 1680)

See also 

 Timeline of Scottish history

References 

 
Years of the 18th century in Scotland
Scotland
1750s in Scotland